Dammika Ranatunga (born 12 October 1962) is a former Sri Lankan cricketer who played in two Test matches and four One Day Internationals in 1989.

He is the eldest brother of former Sri Lanka captain Arjuna Ranatunga, Sanjeeva Ranatunga, Nishantha Ranatunga, Prasanna Ranatunga and Ruwan Ranatunga.

In 2015, Ranatunga was appointed by Arjuna Ranatunga as the country's Ports and Shipping Minister.

References

1962 births
Living people
Alumni of Ananda College
Sri Lanka Test cricketers
Sri Lanka One Day International cricketers
Sri Lankan cricketers
Basnahira North cricketers
Sinhalese Sports Club cricketers